Institut National des Jeunes Aveugles (National Institute for Blind Children or Royal Institution for Blind Youth), in Paris, was the first special school for blind students in the world, and served as a model for many subsequent schools for blind students.

History
It was not until the late 18th century that society began to take an interest in the education of the blind. Until that time they were considered mostly uneducable and untrainable. In 1784, Valentin Haüy undertook to teach François Lesueur to read, with the help of the Société philanthropique. It enabled him to prove the efficiency of his method. In 1785, he founded, on his own funds, what was then called the Institute for Blind Youth (Institution des jeunes aveugles), in Coquillère street. In 1786, this school move to a building in Notre-Dame-des-Victoires street, rented by the Société philantropique, a group of benefactors. On December 26, Haüy presents his methods and some of his pupils to Louis XVI. He then receives royal funding for 120 pupils, and the school is renamed Institution Royale des Jeunes Aveugles.

In 1791, during the French Revolution, it became the Institution nationale des jeunes aveugles (National Institute for the Young Blinds), and moved to the Couvent des Célestins. From 1800 to 1815, the school is merged with the Quinze-Vingts Hospital, and renamed Institut national des aveugles travailleurs (National Institute of the working blinds).

In 1816, the school moved into a former prison that was used during the French Revolution. Sébastien Guillié, who had established the first ophthalmological clinic in France and became its director, before being forced to leave in 1821 due to the brutality he exerted against his pupils. Although it was better than its previous location, the building was cold, poorly lit, and unsanitary: students bathed just once a month (there was only one bathroom) and the meals were of poor quality. Louis Braille, the inventor of the braille system, attended the school in 1819 and later taught there. But many different subjects, like grammar, music, history, and science, were taught there.

In 1843, the institute moved into a new, bigger building on Boulevard des Invalides, where it still resides today.

Organ class
The first organ class for blind students was established at the institute in 1826, and, by 1833, fourteen blind students held organist positions in the churches of Paris. The institute continued to produce a number of successful organists, such as André Marchal, Jean Langlais, and Gaston Litaize.

Effect on other schools
Perkins School for the Blind, attended by the famed American deafblind woman Helen Keller, was founded after Samuel Gridley Howe visited the INJA.

References

Further reading 
Louis Braille: A Touch of Genius, C. Michael Mellor, National Braille Press, 2006. Includes sections on Valentin Haüy, Institution Royale des Jeunes Aveugles, Sébastien Guillié, and of course Louis Braille.

External links
 L'Institut National des Jeunes Aveugles (in French)
 History of INJA (in French)

1785 establishments in France
Educational institutions established in 1785
Schools for the blind in France
Schools in France